The Limone Extreme is an international skyrunning competition held for the first time in 2011. It runs every year in Limone sul Garda (Italy) in October and consists of two races SkyRace and Vertical Kilometer both valid for the Skyrunner World Series.

Limone Extreme SkyRace

Limone Extreme Vertical Kilometer

See also 
 Skyrunner World Series

References

External links 
 Official web site

Skyrunning competitions
Skyrunner World Series
Sport in Lombardy
Athletics competitions in Italy
Vertical kilometer running competitions